Dalea neomexicana, the downy prairie clover, is a perennial plant in the legume family (Fabaceae) found in the Sonoran Desert and grasslands of southeastern Arizona to western Texas and into Mexico. Its common name refers to its silky hairs covering it.

References

External links

USDA Plants Profile for Dalea neomexicana (downy prairie clover)

neomexicana
Flora of the Sonoran Deserts
Flora of Arizona
Flora of New Mexico
Flora of Sonora
Flora of Texas
Plants described in 1852